Turritella declivis is a species of sea snail, a marine gastropod mollusk in the family Turritellidae.

Description

Distribution
This marine species occurs off the Agulhas Bank, South Africa.

References

 Adams A. & Reeve L. (1850) Mollusca [in] Adams A. (ed.) The zoology of the voyage of H. M. S. Samarang under the command of Captain Sir Edward Belcher, C. B., F. R. A. S., F. G. S., during the years 1843-1846. Reeve, Benham & Reeve: London. Parts I-III
 Herbert, D. G. (2013) Turritella declivis Adams & Reeve, in Reeve, 1849 (Mollusca: Gastropoda) – a South African not an Australian species, and a characteristic component of the Agulhas Bank benthos. African Zoology 48(2):412-417 page(s): 412–417

Endemic fauna of South Africa
Turritellidae
Gastropods described in 1850